Oidaematophorus mauritius is a moth of the family Pterophoridae. It is known from Mauritius.

References

Oidaematophorini
Moths of Mauritius
Endemic fauna of Mauritius
Moths described in 1994